The 2000–01 California electricity crisis, also known as the Western U.S. energy crisis of 2000 and 2001, was a situation in which the U.S. state of California had a shortage of electricity supply caused by market manipulations and capped retail electricity prices. The state suffered from multiple large-scale blackouts, one of the state's largest energy companies collapsed, and the economic fall-out greatly harmed Governor Gray Davis's standing.

Drought, delays in approval of new power plants, and market manipulation decreased supply. This caused an 800% increase in wholesale prices from April 2000 to December 2000. In addition, rolling blackouts adversely affected many businesses dependent upon a reliable supply of electricity, and inconvenienced many retail consumers.

California had an installed generating capacity of 45 GW (Gigawatts, or billions-of-watts). At the time of the blackouts, demand was 28 GW. A demand-supply gap was created by energy companies, mainly Enron, to create an artificial shortage. Energy traders took power plants offline for maintenance in days of peak demand to increase the price. Traders were thus able to sell power at premium prices, sometimes up to a factor of 20 times its normal value. Because the state government had a cap on retail electricity charges, this market manipulation squeezed the industry's revenue margins, causing the bankruptcy of Pacific Gas and Electric Company (PG&E) and near bankruptcy of Southern California Edison in early 2001.

According to the Federal Energy Regulatory Commission (FERC), the crisis was possible because of legislation instituted in 1996 by the California Legislature (AB 1890) and Governor Pete Wilson that deregulated some aspects of the energy industry. Enron took advantage of this partial deregulation and was involved in economic withholding and inflated price bidding in California's spot markets.

The crisis cost between US$40 and $45 billion.

Causes

Market manipulation 

As the FERC report concluded, market manipulation was only possible as a result of the complex market design produced by the process of partial deregulation. Manipulation strategies were known to energy traders under names such as "Fat Boy", "Death Star", "Forney Perpetual Loop", "Wheel Out", "Ricochet", "Ping Pong", "Black Widow", "Big Foot", "Red Congo", "Cong Catcher" and "Get Shorty". 

In a letter sent from David Fabian to Senator Boxer in 2002, it was alleged that:
 "There is a single connection between northern and southern California's power grids. I heard that Enron traders purposely overbooked that line, then caused others to need it. Next, by California's free-market rules, Enron was allowed to price-gouge at will."

Effects of partial deregulation 

On a federal level, the Energy Policy Act of 1992, for which Enron had lobbied, opened electrical transmission grids to competition, unbundling generation and transmission of electricity.

On the state level, part of California's deregulation process, which was promoted as a means of increasing competition, was also influenced by lobbying from Enron, and began in 1996 when California became the first state to deregulate its electricity market. 

Energy deregulation put the three companies that distribute electricity into a tough situation.  Energy deregulation policy froze or capped the existing price of energy that the three energy distributors could charge. Deregulating the producers of energy did not lower the cost of energy. Deregulation did not encourage new producers to create more power and drive down prices. Instead, with increasing demand for electricity, the producers of energy charged more for electricity.  The producers used moments of spike energy production to inflate the price of energy.  In January 2001, energy producers began shutting down plants to increase prices.

Government price caps 

By keeping the consumer price of electricity artificially low, the California government discouraged citizens from practicing conservation. In February 2001, California governor Gray Davis stated, "Believe me, if I wanted to raise rates I could have solved this problem in 20 minutes."

When the electricity demand in California rose, utilities had no financial incentive to expand production, as long term prices were capped. Instead, wholesalers such as Enron manipulated the market to force utility companies into daily spot markets for short term gain. For example, in a market technique known as megawatt laundering, wholesalers bought up electricity in California at below cap price to sell out of state, creating shortages. In some instances, wholesalers scheduled power transmission to create congestion and drive up prices.

After extensive investigation, the Federal Energy Regulatory Commission (FERC) substantially agreed in 2003:

 "...supply-demand imbalance, flawed market design and inconsistent rules made possible significant market manipulation as delineated in final investigation report. Without underlying market dysfunction, attempts to manipulate the market would not be successful."

 "...many trading strategies employed by Enron and other companies violated the anti-gaming provisions..."

 "Electricity prices in California’s spot markets were affected by economic withholding and inflated price bidding, in violation of tariff anti-gaming provisions."

New regulations 

In the mid-1990s, under Republican Governor Pete Wilson, California began changing the electricity industry. Democratic State Senator Steve Peace was the Chairman of the Senate Committee on Energy at the time and is often credited as "the father of deregulation". The author of the bill was Senator Jim Brulte, a Republican from Rancho Cucamonga.  Wilson admitted publicly that defects in the deregulation system would need fixing by "the next governor".

Supply and demand 

California's population increased by 13% during the 1990s. The State did not build any new major power plants during that time, and California's generation capability decreased 2 percent from 1990 through 1999, while retail sales increased by 11 percent.

California's utilities came to depend in part on the import of excess hydroelectricity from the Pacific Northwest states of Oregon and Washington. During that time, California relied upon out-of-state generators to supply 7 to 11 gigawatts of power. 

In the summer of 2001 a drought in the northwest states reduced the amount of hydroelectric power available to California. Moreover, wholesale prices of natural gas spiked nationwide, rising from around $2 per  at the beginning of 1999 to over $10 per million BTU in the winter of 2000-2001.

The main line which allowed electricity to travel from the north to the south, Path 15, had not been improved for many years and became a major bottleneck point which limited the amount of power that could be sent south to 3,900 MW.

The International Energy Agency estimates that a 5% lowering of demand would result in a 50% price reduction during the peak hours of the California electricity crisis in 2000/2001. With better demand response the market also becomes more resilient to intentional withdrawal of offers from the supply side.

Some key events 

Rolling blackouts affecting 97,000 customers hit the San Francisco Bay area on June 14, 2000, and San Diego Gas & Electric Company filed a complaint alleging market manipulation by some energy producers in August 2000.  On December 7, 2000, suffering from low supply and idled power plants, the California Independent System Operator (ISO), which manages the California power grid, declared the first statewide Stage 3 power alert, meaning power reserves were below 3 percent. Rolling blackouts were avoided when the state halted two large state and federal water pumps to conserve electricity.

Most notably, the city of Los Angeles was unaffected by the crisis because government-owned public utilities in California (including the Los Angeles Department of Water & Power) were exempt from the deregulation legislation and sold their excess power to private utilities in the state (mostly to Southern California Edison) during the crises.  That enabled much of the greater Los Angeles area to suffer only rolling brown-outs rather than long term black outs suffered in other parts of the state.

Consequences of wholesale price rises on the retail market 

As a result of the actions of electricity wholesalers, Southern California Edison (SCE) and Pacific Gas & Electric (PG&E) were buying from a spot market at very high prices but were unable to raise retail rates. For a product that the IOU's used to produce for about three cents per kilowatt hour of electricity, they were paying eleven to fifty cents, or occasionally even more, but they were capped at 6.7 cents per kilowatt hour when charging their retail customers. As a result, PG&E filed bankruptcy, and Southern California Edison worked diligently on a workout plan with the State of California to save their company from the same fate.

According to a 2007 study of Department of Energy data by Power in the Public Interest, retail electricity prices rose much more from 1999 to 2007 in states that adopted deregulation than in those that did not.

Involvement of Enron 

One of the energy wholesalers that became notorious for "gaming the market" and reaping huge speculative profits was Enron Corporation. Enron CEO Kenneth Lay mocked the efforts by the California state government to thwart the practices of the energy wholesalers, saying, "In the final analysis, it doesn't matter what you crazy people in California do, because I got smart guys who can always figure out how to make money." The original statement was made in a phone conversation between S. David Freeman (Chairman of the California Power Authority) and Kenneth Lay in 2000, according to the statements made by Freeman to the Senate Subcommittee on Consumer Affairs, Foreign Commerce and Tourism in April and May 2002.

S. David Freeman, who was appointed Chair of the California Power Authority in the midst of the crisis, made the following statements about Enron's involvement in testimony submitted before the Subcommittee on Consumer Affairs, Foreign Commerce and Tourism of the Senate Committee on Commerce, Science and Transportation on May 15, 2002:

 "There is one fundamental lesson we must learn from this experience: electricity is really different from everything else. It cannot be stored, it cannot be seen, and we cannot do without it, which makes opportunities to take advantage of a deregulated market endless. It is a public good that must be protected from private abuse. If Murphy's Law were written for a market approach to electricity, then the law would state 'any system that can be gamed, will be gamed, and at the worst possible time.' And a market approach for electricity is inherently gameable. Never again can we allow private interests to create artificial or even real shortages and to be in control.

 "Enron stood for secrecy and a lack of responsibility. In electric power, we must have openness and companies that are responsible for keeping the lights on. We need to go back to companies that own power plants with clear responsibilities for selling real power under long-term contracts. There is no place for companies like Enron that own the equivalent of an electronic telephone book and game the system to extract an unnecessary middleman’s profits. Companies with power plants can compete for contracts to provide the bulk of our power at reasonable prices that reflect costs. People say that Governor Davis has been vindicated by the Enron confession."

Handling of the crisis

Governor Gray Davis 

Some critics, such as Arianna Huffington, alleged that Davis was lulled to inaction by campaign contributions from energy producers. In addition, the California State Legislature would sometimes push Davis to act decisively by taking over power plants which were known to have been gamed and place them back under control of the utilities, ensuring a more steady supply and punished the worst manipulators. Meanwhile, conservatives argued that Davis signed overpriced energy contracts, employed incompetent negotiators, and refused to allow prices to rise for residences statewide much like they did in San Diego, which they argue could have given Davis more leverage against the energy traders and encouraged more conservation. More criticism is given in the book Conspiracy of Fools, which gives the details of a meeting between the governor and his officials; Clinton Administration Treasury officials; and energy executives, including market manipulators such as Enron, where Gray Davis disagreed with the treasury officials and energy executives. They advised suspending environmental studies to build power plants and a small rate hike to prepare for long-term power contracts (Davis eventually signed overpriced ones, as noted above), while Davis supported price caps, denounced the other solutions as too politically risky, and allegedly acted rudely. The contracts Davis signed locked Californians into high electric costs for the next decade. As of October 2011 electric rates in California had yet to return to pre-contract levels.

Arnold Schwarzenegger 

On May 17, 2001, future Republican governor Arnold Schwarzenegger and former Los Angeles Mayor Republican Richard Riordan met with Enron CEO Kenneth Lay at the Peninsula Beverly Hills Hotel in Beverly Hills. The meeting was convened for Enron to present its "Comprehensive Solution for California," which called for an end to federal and state investigations into Enron's role in the California energy crisis.

On October 7, 2003, Schwarzenegger was elected Governor of California to replace Davis.

Over a year later, he attended the commissioning ceremony of a new Western Area Power Administration (WAPA) 500 kV line remedying the aforementioned power bottleneck on Path 15.

Congressional Response to the Crisis 

In the Spring of 2001, House Government Affairs Energy Policy and Regulatory Affairs Subcommittee Chairman Doug Ose held a series of field hearings in California and Nevada, receiving testimony from Public Utilities Commission Chair Loretta Lynch, FERC General Counsel Kevin Madden, California ISO President and CEO Terry Winter and Central Valley farmers. During the hearings, the state and federal representatives cast blame on each other, but there was consensus that warning signals to the crisis were missed repeatedly.

Federal Energy Regulatory Commission 

The Federal Energy Regulatory Commission (FERC) was intimately involved with the handling of the crisis from the summer of 2000. There were in fact at least four separate FERC investigations.
 The Gaming Case, investigating general allegations of manipulation of the Western energy markets.
 The Enron Western Markets Investigation, FERC Docket Number PA02-2, specifically investigating the involvement of Enron and other companies in manipulating the energy markets.
 The Refund Case, involving wide-ranging recovery of illegal profits made by some companies during the crisis.
 The Economic Withholding and Anomalous Bidding Case.

In December 2005, the Commission filed a report to the U. S. Congress on its response to the California Electricity Crisis, 
which states that "To date, the Commission staff has facilitated settlements resulting in over $6.3 billion."

On August 17, 2013, the British Columbia company Powerex agreed to a $750 million refund as a settlement over charges of manipulating electricity prices during 2000.

See also 

 Energy crisis
 List of power outages

References

External links 

 Federal Energy Regulatory Commission (FERC) Final Report on Price Manipulation in Western Markets (March 23, 2003)
 Findings at a glance 
 Chronology in detail
 Further documents, including detailed report
 Reports on Enron and the California Energy Crisis by McCullough Research – page includes many downloadable reports, some of which were presented as evidence during investigations into the causes of the crisis.
 Susan L. Pope, "California Electricity Price Spikes: An Update on the Facts" (December 9, 2002) (Opposes the McCullough research and supports the view that the crisis was an outcome of genuine problems with supply and demand)
 Enron Traders Caught On Tape – Gloating about manipulating California's energy market. (CBS Evening News)
 Enron Tapes Hint Chiefs Knew About Power Ploys – (Los Angeles Times)
 Papers Show That Enron Manipulated Calif. Crisis – (The Washington Post)
 "Defying Corporations, Defining Democracy": As Internal Memos Reveal That Enron Drove Up Power Prices in California – A talk to Author Richard Grossman (Democracy Now!)
 Schwarzenegger Accused of Involvement in $9B California Swindle with Enron’s Ken Lay – (Democracy Now!)
 
 

2000s energy crisis
Electric power in the United States
Power outages in the United States
Electricity economics
Enron
Market failure
Scandals in California
Sempra Energy
George W. Bush administration controversies
Electricity crisis
2000 disasters in the United States
2001 disasters in the United States
2000 in California
2001 in California